The FIL European Luge Championships 2006 took place in Winterberg, Germany for the fourth time having hosted the event previously in 1982, 1992, and 2000.

Medalists

Medal table

References

FIL European Luge Championships
2006 in luge
Luge in Germany
2006 in German sport
International sports competitions hosted by Germany
January 2006 sports events in Europe